MADT may refer to:

 Micro alloy diffused transistor, in electronics
 Multiple APIC Description Table, in computing